Aukštaitija Stadium is a multi-purpose stadium in Panevėžys, Lithuania.  It is currently used mostly for football matches and is the home ground of FK Panevėžys and earlier of  FK Ekranas Panevėžys. It is named Aukštaitija, one of the five regions of Lithuania.

See also
Official FK Ekranas Website In English

Sports venues completed in 1965
Football venues in Lithuania
Multi-purpose stadiums in Lithuania
Buildings and structures in Panevėžys
Sport in Panevėžys